Physalis coztomatl is a plant species in the genus Physalis. It produces edible orange-yellow fruits, but is rarely cultivated. The leaves are oval-shaped. It is native to America; the Aztecs used it medicinally. It contains labdane diterpenes, and was the first species in Physalis in which  they were found.

References

External links

coztomatl
Edible Solanaceae
Plants described in 1849
Taxa named by José Mariano Mociño
Taxa named by Martín Sessé y Lacasta
Taxa named by Michel Félix Dunal